The Lille Braderie (French: Braderie de Lille) is a braderie, or annual street market/flea market, that takes place on the weekend of the first Sunday of September in  Lille, France, in the northern Hauts-de-France region. Its dates back to the 12th century, welcoming nearly three million visitors each year. The Braderie de Lille is one of the largest gatherings in France and the largest flea market in Europe. The braderie has a 100km of aisles for 10,000 exhibitors.

This event is surrounded by concerts, a fun fair, a half-marathon that precedes it, increased catering in the city (various mobile stands added to the local restaurants, Moules-frites (the traditional dish), and  regional beers). It is an opportunity for many (especially for the students of Lille) to party all night in the city and its many bars. Resulting in slowly growing heaps of restaurant mussels shells.

The 2016 market was cancelled by the mayor Martine Aubry due to security fears because of recent terrorism in France.

External links
Official website

References

Lille
Street culture
Bazaars
Retail markets in France
Street fairs